José Largacha Rivas is a Colombian football forward. He currently plays for Atlético Bucaramanga.

References

1987 births
Living people
Colombian footballers
Independiente Santa Fe footballers
Estudiantes de Mérida players
Patriotas Boyacá footballers
Atlético Bucaramanga footballers
Cúcuta Deportivo footballers
Llaneros F.C. players
Categoría Primera B players
Venezuelan Primera División players
Colombian expatriate footballers
Expatriate footballers in Venezuela
Association football forwards
Sportspeople from Chocó Department